Kevin Corrigan is a professional Rugby Union player for Esher. His current position is at Hooker.

Corrigan played for Esher RFC before joining Harlequins. Prior to that he played for the Rotherham Titans and Lansdowne FC. He also played for an Irish league XV the AIB club International in the 2007.

References

External links
  Sky Sports profile
  Statbunker

Esher RFC players
Irish rugby union players
Rotherham Titans players
Living people
Place of birth missing (living people)
Year of birth missing (living people)
Rugby union hookers